The 2011 Portsmouth City Council election took place on Thursday 5 May 2011 to elect members of Portsmouth City Council in Hampshire, England. The election took place on the same day as a referendum on the parliamentary voting system, and one third of the council (14 seats) was up for election using the first-past-the-post voting system. The Liberal Democrats won a majority of the seats being contested, and remained in overall control of the council.

After the election, the composition of the council was:
 Liberal Democrats: 23
 Conservatives: 17
 Labour: 2

Election result
The only seats to change hands were Central Southsea and Nelson, both of which saw councillors who had previously defected to the Liberal Democrats from the Conservatives and Labour respectively retain their seats under the Liberal Democrat label. All comparisons are to the 2007 local elections, at which the same tranche of seats were contested.

Ward results
Comparisons for the purpose of determining a gain, hold or loss of a seat, and for all percentage changes, is to the last time these specific seats were up for election in 2007.

References

2011
2011 English local elections
2010s in Hampshire